A Corsican autonomy referendum was held on 6 July 2003. Voters were asked whether or not they approved the restructuring of the system of administration on Corsica. Had the referendum been successful, the two départements on the island would have been abolished leaving only the Corsican Assembly which would be granted additional functions including some limited powers on raising and spending taxes. The suggestion was not approved, albeit by a very small margin. 51% voted against the proposal, with 49% supporting it. The difference between the yes and no vote was 2,190 votes.

Results 

The question asked was: Do you approve of the proposed suggestions to change the institutional organisation of Corsica represented in law 2003-486 of June 10, 2003?

Results by Department

Results by Canton

Results according to constituencies

See also 
Corsican nationalism

References

Autonomy referendums
Corsican nationalism
Referendums in France
Corsican autonomy referendum
Corsica